Mariathas Manojanraj  was a  minority Sri Lankan Tamil distributor for the Tamil newspaper Thinakkural  from Jaffna, Sri Lanka. He was  killed by a mine which exploded when he went to collect newspapers for distribution on 27 July 2006 in Navakeeri  near Jaffna.

Background
Mariathas Manojanraj was part of a series of killing of Tamil media workers particularly those seen supporting the Tamil nationalist cause as the newspaper Thinakkural was seen to be doing. It was seen as part of the intimidation of Tamil media. Free Media Movement an   International Federation of Journalists associate reported that  newspapers like Sudor Oli and Thinakkural have received threats from anti-LTTE para-military groups demanding that their distribution be stopped and there were attempts to unofficially censure Tamil media organisations.

Incident

Mariathas Manojanraj was killed while he was travelling by motorbike to collect newspapers by a mine blast. He had earlier registered at the Sri Lankan checkpoint. The Sri Lankan Army claims that he was a victim a mine meant for an Army Patrol however his relatives claim that the Tamil paramilitaries or the Sri Lankan is responsible for it .

Government investigation
The international Press institute has called in for impartial government investigation.

See also
Sri Lankan civil war
Human Rights in Sri Lanka
Notable assassinations of the Sri Lankan Civil War

References

External links
Sri Lanka mission report
 Nine recommendations for improving media freedom in Sri Lanka – RSF
Media in Sri Lanka
Free Speech in Sri Lanka

Year of birth missing
2006 deaths
Sri Lankan Tamil journalists
Sri Lankan murder victims
People murdered in Sri Lanka